Perruzza is a surname of Italian origin. Notable people with the surname include:

 Anthony Perruzza (born 1959 or 1960), Canadian politician
 Jordan Perruzza (born 2001), Canadian soccer player

Italian-language surnames